Nalin Vimukthi (born Jayamaha Mudalige Don Nalin Vimukthi Jayamaha on 28 February 1988) is a Sri Lankan cricketer. He is a left-handed batsman and wicket-keeper who plays for Ragama Cricket Club. He was born in Kattiyawa-Talawa.

Vimukthi made his List A debut for the side during the 2009-10 Premier Limited Overs Tournament, against Badureliya Sports Club. He did not bat in the match, but took a single catch from behind the stumps, that of former One-Day International player Hemantha Wickramaratne.

External links
Nalin Vimukthi at ESPNcricinfo

1988 births
Living people
Sri Lankan cricketers
Ragama Cricket Club cricketers
Panadura Sports Club cricketers
Bloomfield Cricket and Athletic Club cricketers